The Grumman F8F Bearcat is an American single-engine carrier-based fighter aircraft introduced in late World War II. It served during the mid-20th century in the United States Navy, the United States Marine Corps, and the air forces of other nations. It was Grumman Aircraft's last piston engined fighter aircraft.

Modified versions of the Bearcat have broken speed records for piston-engined aircraft. Today, the Bearcat is popular among warbird owners and air racers.

Design and development

Concept
The Bearcat concept began during a meeting between Battle of Midway veteran F4F Wildcat pilots and Grumman Vice President Jake Swirbul at Pearl Harbor on 23 June 1942. At the meeting, Lieutenant Commander Jimmie Thach emphasized one of the most important requirements in a good fighter plane was "climb rate".

Climb performance is strongly related to the power-to-weight ratio, and is maximized by wrapping the smallest and lightest possible airframe around the most powerful available engine. Another goal was that the G-58 (Grumman's design designation for the aircraft) should be able to operate from escort carriers, which were then limited to the obsolescent F4F Wildcat as the Grumman F6F Hellcat was too large and heavy. A small, lightweight aircraft would make this possible. After intensively analyzing carrier warfare in the Pacific Theater of Operations for a year and a half, Grumman began development of the G-58 Bearcat in late 1943.

Design

In 1943, Grumman was in the process of introducing the F6F Hellcat, powered by the Pratt & Whitney R-2800 engine which provided . The R-2800 was the most powerful American engine available at that time, so it would be retained for the G-58. This meant that improved performance would have to come from a lighter airframe.

To meet this goal, the Bearcat's fuselage was about  shorter than the Hellcat, and was cut down vertically behind the cockpit area. This allowed the use of a bubble canopy, the first to be fitted to a US Navy fighter. The vertical stabilizer was the same height as the Hellcat's, but increased aspect ratio, giving it a thinner look. The wingspan was  less than the Hellcat's. Structurally the fuselage used flush riveting as well as spot welding, with a heavy gauge 302W aluminum alloy skin suitable for carrier landings. Armor protection was provided for the pilot, engine and oil cooler.

The Hellcat used a  three-bladed Hamilton Standard propeller. A slight reduction in size was made by moving to a  Aeroproducts four-bladed propeller. Keeping the prop clear of the deck required long landing gear, which, combined with the shortened fuselage, gave the Bearcat a significant "nose-up" profile on land. The hydraulically operated undercarriage used an articulated trunnion which extended the length of the oleo legs when lowered; as the undercarriage retracted the legs were shortened, enabling them to fit into a wheel well which was entirely in the wing. An additional benefit of the inward retracting units was a wide track, which helped counter propeller torque on takeoff and gave the F8F good ground and carrier deck handling.

The design team had set the goal that the G-58 should weigh  fully loaded. As development continued it became clear this was impossible to achieve as the structure of the new fighter had to be made strong enough for aircraft carrier landings. Ultimately much of the weight-saving measures included restricting the internal fuel capacity to (later ) and limiting the fixed armament to four .50 cal Browning M2/AN machine guns, two in each wing. The limited range due to the reduced fuel load would mean it would be useful in the interception role, but meant that the Hellcat would still be needed for longer range patrols. A later role was defending the fleet against airborne kamikaze attacks. Compared to the Hellcat, the Bearcat was 20% lighter, had a 30% better rate of climb and was  faster.

Another weight-saving concept the designers came up with was detachable wingtips. The wings were designed to fold at a point about  out along the span, reducing the space taken up on the carrier. Normally the hinge system would have to be built very strong in order to transmit loads from the outer portions of the wing to the main spar in the inner section, which adds considerable weight. Instead of building the entire wing to be able to withstand high-g loads, only the inner portion of the wing was able to do this. The outer portions were more lightly constructed, and designed to snap off at the hinge line if the g-force exceeded 7.5 g. In this case the aircraft would still be flyable and could be repaired after returning to the carrier. This saved  of weight.

Prototypes
The design was completed in November 1943 and an order for two prototypes was placed on 27 November 1943 under the BuAir designation XF8F-1. The first prototype flew on 21 August 1944, only nine months after the design effort started. Compared to the Vought F4U Corsair, the Bearcat was marginally slower but more maneuverable and climbed more quickly.

Testing demonstrated a number of problems, notably a lack of horizontal stability, an underpowered trim system, landing gear that could be extended only at slow speeds, an unreliable airspeed indicator, and a cramped cockpit. The test pilots also requested that six guns be installed. The stability problem was addressed on the second prototype by adding a triangular fillet to the front of the vertical stabilizer. The extra guns could not be incorporated due to weight and balance considerations.

Production
The Navy placed a production contract for 2,023 aircraft based on the second prototype on 6 October 1944. On 5 February 1945 they awarded another contract for 1,876 slightly modified aircraft from General Motors, given the designation F3M-1. These differed primarily in having the R-2800-34W engine and a small increase in fuel capacity.

Deliveries from Grumman began on 21 May 1945. The end of the war led to the Grumman order being reduced to 770 examples, and the GM contract being cancelled outright. An additional order was placed for 126 F8F-1B's replacing the .50 cal machine guns with the 20 mm M2 cannon, the US version of the widely used Hispano-Suiza HS.404. Fifteen of these were later modified as F8F-1N night fighters with an APS-19 radar mounted under the starboard wing.

The Bearcat held this record for 10 years until it was broken by a jet fighter (which still could not match the Bearcat's short takeoff distance).

In 1948 Grumman introduced a number of improvements to produce the F8F-2. Among the changes were a modified cowling design, taller vertical fin, and the slightly more powerful R-2800-30W engine producing . A total of 293 F8F-2s were produced, along with 12 F8F-2N night fighters and 60 F8F-2P reconnaissance versions.

Production ended in 1949, and the first units began to convert off the type that year. The last Bearcats were withdrawn in 1952.

Operational history

United States

The F8F prototypes were ordered in November 1943 and first flew on 21 August 1944, a mere nine months later. The first production aircraft was delivered in February 1945 and the first squadron, Fighter Squadron 19 (VF-19), was operational by 21 May 1945, but World War II was over before the aircraft saw combat service.

One problem that became evident in service was the snap-off wingtips not working as expected. While they worked well under carefully controlled conditions in flight and on the ground, in the field, where aircraft were repetitively stressed by landing on carriers and since the wings were slightly less carefully made in the factories, there was a possibility that only one wingtip would break away with the possibility of the aircraft crashing. This was replaced with an explosives system to blow the wingtips off together, which also worked well, but this ended when a ground technician died due to an accidental triggering. In the end, the wings were reinforced and the aircraft limited to 7.5 g.

Postwar, the F8F became a major U.S. Navy and U.S. Marine Corps fighter, equipping 24 fighter squadrons in the Navy and a smaller number in the Marines. Often mentioned as one of the best-handling piston-engine fighters ever built, its performance was sufficient to outperform many early jets. Its capability for aerobatic performance is illustrated by its selection as the second demonstration aircraft for the navy's elite Blue Angels flight demonstration squadron in 1946, replacing the Grumman F6F Hellcat. The Blue Angels flew the Bearcat until the team was temporarily disbanded in 1950 during the Korean War and pressed into operational combat service. The F9F Panther and McDonnell F2H Banshee largely replaced the Bearcat as their performance and other advantages eclipsed piston-engine fighters.

France and South Vietnam 
The first combat for the F8F Bearcat was during the French Indochina War (1946–1954) when nearly 200 Bearcats were delivered to the French forces in 1951. 

When the war ended in 1954 and French forces withdrew, 28 surviving Bearcats were donated to South Vietnam, and served with the Republic of Vietnam Air Force from 1956. The Vietnamese Bearcats were retired from 1960 onwards, replaced with Douglas A-1 Skyraiders and North American T-28 Trojans as the Vietnam War (1957–1975) continued.

Thailand
F8Fs were also supplied to Thailand during the late 1940s.

Air racing

Bearcats have long been popular in air racing. A stock Bearcat flown by Mira Slovak and sponsored by Bill Stead won the first Reno Air Race in 1964. Rare Bear, a highly modified F8F owned by Lyle Shelton, went on to dominate the event for decades, often competing with Daryl Greenamyer, another famous racer with victories in his own Bearcat (Conquest I, now at the Smithsonian's NASM) and holder of a piston-engined aircraft world speed record in it. Rare Bear also set many performance records, including the 3 km World Speed Record for piston-driven aircraft, set in 1989, and a new time-to-climb record ( in 91.9 seconds, set in 1972, breaking the 1946 record cited above).

Variants

XF8F-1
Prototype aircraft, two built.

F8F-1 Bearcat
Single-seat fighter aircraft, equipped with folding wings, a retractable tailwheel, self-sealing fuel tanks, a very small dorsal fin, powered by a  Pratt & Whitney R-2800-34W Double Wasp radial piston engine, armed with four  machine guns, 658 built.

F8F-1B Bearcat
Single-seat fighter version, armed with four AN/M3 20 mm cannons, 100 built.

F8F-1C Bearcat
Originally designated F8F-1C, redesignated as F8F-1B, 126 built.

F8F-1D
F8F-1s converted into drone control aircraft.

F8F-1(D)B Bearcat
Unofficial designation for export version for France and Thailand.

F8F-1E Bearcat
F8F-1 night-fighter prototype carrying APS-4 radar.

XF8F-1N
F8F-1 conversion into night fighter prototypes.

F8F-1N Bearcat
Night fighter version, equipped with an APS-19 radar, 12 built.

F8F-1P Bearcat
F8F-1 conversion photo reconnaissance conversion.

F3M-1 Bearcat
Planned designation for F8F aircraft constructed by General Motors.

F4W-1 Bearcat
Planned designation for F8F aircraft constructed by Canadian Car and Foundry.

XF8F-2
F8F-1 conversion with engine upgrade, revised engine cowling, taller tail.

F8F-2 Bearcat
Improved version, equipped with a redesigned engine cowling, taller fin and rudder, armed with four 20 mm cannons, powered by a Pratt & Whitney R-2800-30W radial piston engine, 293 built.

F8F-2D
F8F-2s converted into drone control aircraft.

F8F-2N Bearcat
Night-fighter version, equipped with an APS-19 radar, 12 built.

F8F-2P Bearcat
Photo-reconnaissance version, fitted with camera equipment, armed with two  cannons, 60 built.

G-58A/B
Two civil aircraft. The first was owned by the Gulf Oil Company for the use of Major Alford Williams, the second one was used by Grumman as a demonstrator aircraft and was flown by Roger Wolfe Kahn.

Operators

 French Air Force

 Royal Thai Air Force

 United States Navy
 United States Marine Corps

 Republic of Vietnam Air Force

Surviving aircraft

Thailand
Airworthy
F8F-1
122120 – Tango Squadron, Foundation for the Preservation and Development of Thai Aircraft.
On display
F8F-1
94956 – Royal Thai Air Force Museum in Bangkok.

United Kingdom
Airworthy
F8F-2
121714 – The Fighter Collection, Duxford.

United States
Airworthy
F8F-1
90454 – privately owned in Fountain Hills, Arizona.
95255 – based at Lewis Air Legends in San Antonio, Texas.
F8F-1B
122095 – privately owned in Indianapolis, Indiana.
F8F-2
121748 – privately owned in Houston, Texas.
121752 – based at Erickson Aircraft Collection in Madras, Oregon.
121776 – privately owned in Wilmington, Delaware.
122614 – based at Lewis Air Legends in San Antonio, Texas.
122619 – based at Lewis Air Legends in San Antonio, Texas.
122629 – based at Lewis Air Legends in San Antonio, Texas.
122637 – privately owned in Houston, Texas.
122674 – based at Commemorative Air Force (Southern California Wing) in Camarillo, California.
G-58 Gulfhawk (two civilian built Bearcats)
G-58A – based at the Planes of Fame Air Museum in Chino, California.
G-58B – based at Palm Springs Air Museum in Palm Springs, California.
On display
F8F-2
121646 – Steven F. Udvar-Hazy Center of the National Air and Space Museum in Chantilly, Virginia.
F8F-2P
121710 – National Naval Aviation Museum at NAS Pensacola, Florida.
Under Restoration
F8F-1
95356 – to airworthiness by private owner in Bentonville, Arkansas.
F8F-2
121679 – to airworthiness by private owner in Livermore, California.

Specifications (F8F-2)

See also

References

Notes

Citations

Bibliography

 Andrews, Hal. The Grumman F8F Bearcat (Aircraft in profile 107). Windsor, Berkshire, UK: Profile Publications Ltd., 1972 (reprinted from 1966).
 Bridgman, Leonard. "The Grumman Bearcat". Jane’s Fighting Aircraft of World War II. London: Studio, 1946. .
 Brown, Eric. "Last of the Wartime 'Cats". Air International, Vol. 18, No. 5, May 1980. Stamford, UK: Key Publishing. .
 Chant, Christopher. Grumman F8F Bearcat: Super Profile. Sparkford, Yeovil, UK: Haynes Publishing, 1985. .
 Drendel, Lou. U.S. Navy Carrier Fighters of World War II. Carrollton, TX: Squadron/Signal Publications Inc., 1987. .
 Ewing, Steve. Thach Weave: The Life of Jimmie Thach. Annapolis, Maryland: Naval Institute Press. 2004. .
 Francillon, Rene J. Grumman Aircraft Since 1929. Annapolis, Maryland: Naval Institute Press, 1989. .
 Green, William. "Grumman F8F-1 Bearcat". War Planes of the Second World War, Volume Four: Fighters. London: Macdonald & Co. (Publishers) Ltd., 1961, pp. 109–111. .
 Green, William and Gordon Swanborough. "Grumman F8F Bearcat". WW2 Fact Files: US Navy and Marine Corps Fighters. London: Macdonald and Jane's Publishers Ltd., 1976, pp. 62–63. .
 Gunston, Bill. Grumman: Sixty Years of Excellence. London: Orion Books, 1988. .
 Hansen, James R. First Man: The Life of Neil A. Armstrong. New York: Simon & Schuster, 2005. .
 Hardy, M. J. Sea, Sky and Stars: An Illustrated History of Grumman Aircraft. London: Arms and Armour Press, 1987. .
 Maloney, Edward T. Grumman F8F Bearcat (Aero Series Vol. 20). Fallbrook, California: Aero Publishers, 1969. .
 Manevy, Jean Christophe. "French Bearcats in Indo-China 1951–1954". Air International, Vol. 44, No. 6, June 1993, pp. 278–280. Stamford, UK: Key Publishing. .
 Meyer, "Corky". "Clipping the Bearcat's Wing". Flight Journal, Vol. 3, No. 4, August 1998.
 Morgan, Eric B. "Grumman's Hot Rod". Twenty-first Profile, Volume 1, no. 12. New Milton, Hantfordshire, UK: Profile Publications, 1972. .
 Morgan, Eric B. "Grumman Bearcat part II". Twenty-first Profile, Volume 2, no. 17. New Milton, Hantfordshire, UK: Profile Publications, 1972. .
 O'Leary, Michael. United States Naval Fighters of World War II in Action. Poole, Dorset, UK: Blandford Press, 1980. .
 Scrivner, Charles L. F8F Bearcat in Action (Aircraft Number 99). Carrollton, Texas: Squadron/Signal Publications Inc., 1990. .
 Swanborough, Gordon and Peter M. Bowers. United States Navy Aircraft since 1911. Annapolis, Maryland: Naval Institute Press 1991, pp. 241–243. .
 Taylor, John W.R. "Grumman F8F Bearcat". Combat Aircraft of the World from 1909 to the Present. New York: G.P. Putnam's Sons, 1969. .

External links

 Grumman F8F Bearcat articles and publications
 Warbird Alley: Bearcat page – Information about Bearcats still flying today
 AN 01-85FD-1 Pilot's Handbook for Navy Models F8F-1, F8F-1B, F8F-1N, F8F-2, F8F-2N, F8F-2P Aircraft (1949)
 Pictures from the Grumman archive

F08F Bearcat
Grumman F8F
Single-engined tractor aircraft
Low-wing aircraft
Carrier-based aircraft
Racing aircraft
Aircraft first flown in 1944